Blast2GO, first published in 2005, is a bioinformatics software tool for the automatic, high-throughput functional annotation of novel sequence data (genes proteins). It makes use of the BLAST  algorithm to identify similar sequences to then transfers existing functional annotation from yet characterised sequences to the novel one. The functional information is represented via the Gene Ontology (GO), a  controlled vocabulary of functional attributes. The Gene Ontology, or GO, is a major bioinformatics initiative to unify the representation of gene and gene product attributes across all species.

See also 

 Protein function prediction
 Functional genomics
 Bioinformatics

References

External links 

 Blast2GO - Tool for functional annotation of (novel) sequences and the analysis of annotation data.
Company developing Blast2GO — BioBam Bioinformatics S.L., a bioinformatics company dedicated to creating user-friendly software for the scientific community is developing, maintaining and distributing Blast2GO.
Gene Ontology Tools — Provides access to the ontologies, software tools, annotated gene product lists, and reference documents describing the GO and its uses.
 PlantRegMap—Plant GO annotation for 165 species and GO enrichment analysis

Bioinformatics algorithms
Bioinformatics software
Laboratory software
Public-domain software
Genomics